Whitehead's swiftlet (Aerodramus whiteheadi) is a species of swift in the family Apodidae. It is endemic to the Philippines. It is named after the British explorer John Whitehead (1860–1899) who collected natural history specimens in Borneo and elsewhere in Southeast Asia.

Its natural habitat is subtropical or tropical moist montane forests. Its status is insufficiently known.

References

Whitehead's swiftlet
Endemic birds of the Philippines
Whitehead's swiftlet
Taxonomy articles created by Polbot